The St. James Parish Public Schools is a school district headquartered in Lutcher, Louisiana, United States. The district serves all of St. James Parish.

Schools

Secondary schools
Grades 7-12
Lutcher High School  (Lutcher)
St. James High School  (Unincorporated area)

Primary schools
Grades 2-6
Vacherie Elementary School (South Vacherie)
Grades PK-6
Fifth Ward Elementary School (Unincorporated area)
Gramercy Elementary School (Gramercy)
Lutcher Elementary School (Lutcher)
Paulina Elementary School (Unincorporated area)
Romeville Elementary School (Unincorporated area)
Sixth Ward Elementary School (Unincorporated area)
Grades PK-1
Vacherie Primary School (South Vacherie)

Other Campuses
Career & Technology Center (Lutcher)
Science & Math Academy (Unincorporated area)

Demographics
Total Students (as of October 1, 2007): 4,181
Gender
Male: 51%
Female: 49%
Race/Ethnicity
African American: 67.35%
White: 32.00%
Hispanic: 0.50%
Asian: 0.12%
Native American: 0.02%
Socio-Economic Indicators
At-Risk: 67.50%
Free Lunch: 60.34%
Reduced Lunch: 7.14%

See also
List of school districts in Louisiana

References

External links
St. James Parish Public Schools - Official site.

School districts in Louisiana
Education in St. James Parish, Louisiana